Lappan Chhappan, is a Nepali gangster film directed by Mukunda Bhatta Written by Prabesh Poudel and Prakash jung shah.produced by Damber Bahadur Chand and co-produced by Indra Prasad Kharel. Inspired by the "Lappan Chappan” titled song from Kabaddi Kabaddi, Lappan Chappan is set for release on 24 March 2017. The meaning of the title refers to the act of dishonesty or deception. The majority of the film was shot in Belgium.

Plot
In the capital city of Nepal, two young hackers are living their life until they meet with Baby (Barsa Siwakoti), whose purse and car they have stolen. Baby gives them work to hack the account of a mafia named Baka (Saugat Malla) who is also the boyfriend of Baby.
In another part of story it is shown there is a local goon named Chamero (Arpan Thapa). Chamero is gay and has his special worker named Raju. And he has another reporter worker Mr. Tamang (Dayahang Rai). But actually Tamang is inspector and is ordered by police to join the Chamero gang and bring Baka into the jail.

And in this way the story goes on and in the climax Baby is killed by Chamero and Baka goes to jail, Tamang gets promotion and the two hackers are rich by getting all Baka's money. The two hackers phonecall Tamang and make fun of him. But Tamang replies with the statement that "the dangerous game is about to begin".

As if the sequel is coming soon...

Filming
The film stars Arpan Thapa, Dayahang Rai, and Saugat Malla and was shot in Nepal, Belgium and other parts of Europe.

Cast 
 Dayahang Rai as Inspector Tank Bdr Tamang
 Saugat Malla as Bankaa Don
 Arpan Thapa as Chamero
 Barsha Siwakoti as Baby
 Devu Shrestha as Deven Yuvraj
 Prakash Jung Shah as Guddu 
 Sid Kharel as Rihan
 Nischal Basnet Cameo in song Poko Parera
 Raju Lama as Raju 
 Kesh Bahadur Shahi as CIB chief

Songs

References

External links 
 

2017 films
Films set in Belgium
Films shot in Kathmandu
2010s crime films
Nepalese gangster films